William "Bill" McGinnis is a pioneer of the sport of whitewater rafting, and has authored several books on the subject.

Born and raised in Richmond, California, McGinnis started training as a river guide at age 16 with one of California's first river rafting outfitters. He earned a master's degree in English literature from San Francisco State University in 1970.

McGinnis has numerous U.S. and international first raft descents to his name. He founded Whitewater Voyages in 1975 with a small loan from his grandmother and a borrowed raft. He successfully built this company into the largest rafting company in California, having taken more people down California rivers than any other outfitter.

Several books about Whitewater rafting have been authored by McGinnis. These books helped set standards for the sport of Whitewater rafting, and are used in Whitewater Voyages' guide training programs, as well as by guides, outfitters, and governments throughout the world. He is also a frequent magazine contributor, and often lends his expert testimony to environmental causes.

McGinnis remains active in the river running and outfitter communities. He takes an active role in managing his company, training new guides through guide school programs, and guiding rafting trips.

McGinnis resides at his company headquarters in El Sobrante, California. He has two children, William McGinnis Jr and Alexandra McGinnis.

Paddler of the Century 
In recognition of his many contributions to the sport of rafting McGinnis was named in 2000 as one of the Top 100 Paddlers of the Century by Paddler Magazine, the sport's leading national paddle sport publication.

Published titles 
 Whitewater rafting (1975)
 The Guide's Guide (1981)
 The Class V Briefing (1985)
 River Signals (2000)
 The Guide's Guide Augmented (2006)
 Whitewater: A Thriller (fiction - 2012)

Year of birth missing (living people)
Living people
Sportspeople from Richmond, California
San Francisco State University alumni
Whitewater sports people
Sportspeople from the San Francisco Bay Area